Reeves Glacier is a broad glacier originating on the interior upland and descending between Eisenhower Range and Mount Larsen to merge with the Nansen Ice Sheet along the coast of Victoria Land. Discovered and named by the British Antarctic Expedition, 1907–09, under Shackleton. The New Zealand Antarctic Place-Names Committee (NZ-APC) reported that the glacier is probably named for William Pember Reeves, former New Zealand Cabinet Minister, and the Agent-General for New Zealand in London, 1896–1909.
 

Glaciers of Victoria Land
Scott Coast